Un tour ensemble is a live album of music written and sung by Jean-Jacques Goldman. It was released by Columbia Records in 2003. It was also released on DVD. It was certified platinum in France for sales of 300,000 copies.

Track listing
CD1
Je marche seul
Répétitions
Nos mains
Petite fille
Encore un matin
Poussière
Je voudrais vous revoir
Juste après
En passant
Veiller tard

CD2
Flûtiau et violon approximatifs
Et l'on n'y peut rien
Tournent les violons
Ensemble
On ira
Les choses
Né en 17 à Leidenstadt
C'est pas vrai
Présentation des musiciens
Nuit
Envole-moi
Puisque tu pars

Charts and certifications

Weekly charts

Year-end charts

Certifications

References

Jean-Jacques Goldman albums
2003 live albums
Columbia Records live albums